The North Eastern Railway Class D (later London and North Eastern Railway (LNER) Class H1) was a class of 4-4-4T three-cylinder side tank steam locomotive designed by Vincent Raven in 1913. They were used for rural passenger services. Forty five were built in total; a first batch of twenty, then a further twenty five after the War.

Between 1931 and 1936, all of the LNER H1 class were rebuilt with a 4-6-2T wheel layout and re-classified as A8. They were scrapped between 1957 and 1960.

References 

D
4-4-4T locomotives
Railway locomotives introduced in 1913
Standard gauge steam locomotives of Great Britain
Passenger locomotives